The Memphis Medical District is an area which was created to provide a central location for medical care, serving both Memphis and the Mid-South.

Geography
The Medical District overlaps some of the area known as Crosstown.

Medical services
Anchored by the University of Tennessee Health Science Center, the district is home to major hospitals, emergency rooms, physicians' offices, medical supply manufacturers and distributors, and medical laboratories.  It will soon house the headquarters of BioMedical Works. Some of the hospitals and health service providers in this district include:

Le Bonheur Children's Hospital, 
Regional Medical Center
Methodist School of Radiologic and Imaging Sciences
Memphis Behavioral Health Center, 
VA Memphis
Baptist College of Health Sciences, 
Methodist University Hospital,
Methodist School of Nursing, 
University of Tennessee Health Science Center, College of Pharmacy
Southern College of Optometry
Southwest TN Community College Health Sciences School (which has Shelby County's Only Paramedic Program) are also based in this area.
St. Jude Children's Research Hospital
University of Tennessee College of Medicine
University of Tennessee Dental Health College
Old Baptist Memorial Hospital (Demolished)

See also
List of neighborhoods in Memphis, Tennessee

References

Neighborhoods in Memphis, Tennessee